Welton Township is a township in Clinton County, Iowa, USA.  As of the 2000 census, its population was 528.

History
Welton Township was organized in 1858.

Geography
According to the USGS, it contains three cemeteries: Oak View, Walrod and Welton.

The stream of Negro Creek runs through this township.

Notes

References
 USGS Geographic Names Information System (GNIS)

External links
 US-Counties.com
 City-Data.com

Townships in Clinton County, Iowa
Townships in Iowa
1858 establishments in Iowa
Populated places established in 1858